RDGLDGRN (disemvoweling of Red Gold Green) is an American band based out of Reston, Virginia, a suburb of Washington, D.C. Formed in 2011, the band recorded their debut album at Sound City Studios in 2012 with producer Kevin Augunas and engineer Clif Norrell. They have worked with a wide range of notable musicians, including Dave Grohl and Pharrell Williams. RDGLDGRN released their debut self-titled full-length album in September 2013.

History
Band members Marcus Parham (Red), Andrei Busuioceanu (Gold) and Pierre Desrosiers (Green) met through mutual friends in Reston, Virginia. In the fall of 2011, RDGLDGRN recorded their breakout song "I Love Lamp",  and uploaded their self-produced and directed music video to YouTube, where it reached over 100,000 hits within days. In the spring of 2012, RDGLDGRN recorded their debut album at Sound City Studios with Kevin Augunas (The Lumineers, Edward Sharpe and the Magnetic Zeroes), producer and founder of Fairfax Recordings. The group asked fellow Northern Virginia native Dave Grohl, who was filming his Sound City documentary, to drum on "I Love Lamp." Grohl agreed and played drums for the entire record, with the exception of "Million Fans," which features a sampled breakbeat. An additional Virginia native became involved when Pharrell Williams co-wrote and co-produced "Doing the Most."

In June 2012, the demo recording of "I Love Lamp" was used as the theme song for the world record Hot Wheels Double Loop Dare at the 2012 X Games in Los Angeles, California. In January 2013, British magazine NME released "Million Fans." Days later,  Rolling Stone released "I Love Lamp" with Dave Grohl on drums. The Red Gold Green EP was debuted February 12, 2013 and reached the top 100 on the American iTunes album chart. RDGLDGRN made their television debut on Jimmy Kimmel Live! in March 2013 performing both "I Love Lamp" and "Million Fans." RDGLDGRN performed at SXSW in March 2013, the DC101 Chili Cook-Off in May 2013, and the Vans Warped Tour 2013. RDGLDGRN released their debut self-titled full-length album in September 2013.

On October 24, 2014, RDGLDGRN was featured in the Washington, DC episode of Dave Grohl's HBO documentary series Foo Fighters Sonic Highways. This episode premiered the second song off the Foo Fighters' Sonic Highways album "The Feast and the Famine," which showcases the bounce beat as played by Grohl in RDGLDGRN's "I Love Lamp."

Musical style

Indie go-go is a combination of indie rock and a syncopated Washington, DC rhythm known as go-go.

Press descriptions of the music:

The band's sound has also been described as alternative hip hop go-go, alternative rock, hip hop, rap rock, indie rock, pop, and garage rock.   
The band has cited musical influences from many different genres, including The Beatles, Bob Marley, Outkast, Vampire Weekend, and Chuck Brown.

Band members
 Red (Marcus Parham) - guitar (2011–present)
 Gold (Andrei Busuioceanu) - bass (2011–present)
 Green (Pierre Desrosiers) - vocals (2011–present)

Discography

Red Gold Green LP (2013)
Red Gold Green LP 2 (2015)
 Red Gold Green Radio (2017)
 Red Gold Green 3 (2019)
Red Gold Green (2013)

Red Gold Green LP 2 (2015)

 Red Gold Green Radio (2017)

 Red Gold Green 3 (2019)

References

External links

 

Musical groups from Washington, D.C.
Go-go musical groups
People from Reston, Virginia